Schizothorax lissolabiatus is a species of ray-finned fish in the genus Schizothorax It is found in the upper reaches of the Mekong River, Black River and Pearl River in Yunnan. It is caught for human consumption.

References 

Schizothorax
Fish described in 1964